Love Has Lifted Me is an album by Stephanie Mills. The album was originally recorded in 1975 after For the First Time was released, but was not released until 1982.

Track listing
 "Love Has Lifted Me" 5:35
 "Love is Everywhere" (Steven J. Hunt) - 4:00
 "I Don't Want to Be Reminded" 3:33
 "You are the Melody of My Life" 4:06
 "This Empty Place" (Burt Bacharach, Hal David) - 3:01
 "I Hope We Don't Run Out of Music" (Michael L. Smith) - 3:40
 "The Kingdom Within Everyone" 4:24
 "Simple Masterpiece" 4:36

References

1982 albums
Stephanie Mills albums
Motown albums